Asian Highway 75 (AH75) is a road in the Asian Highway Network running 1920 km (1190 miles) from Tejen, Turkmenistan to Chabahar, Iran. The route is as follows:

Turkmenistan
 (Gaudan Highway) Tejen - Serakhs

Iran
 : Sarakhs - Mashhad
  Mashhad Northern Bypass Freeway
  Freeway 2: Mashhad - Baghcheh
 : Baghcheh - Birjand - Nehbandan - Dashtak - Zahedan - Chabahar

References

External links 

 Iran road map on Young Journalists Club

Asian Highway Network
Roads in Turkmenistan
Roads in Iran